Darbyshire is a closed station located in the town of Darbyshire, on the Cudgewa railway line in Victoria, Australia. Today there is nothing left of the station.

Disused railway stations in Victoria (Australia)
Shire of Towong